Martyna Trajdos (born 5 April 1989) is a German judoka competing in the women's 63 kg division.  She won gold at the 2015 European Judo Championships in Baku. She competed at the 2016 Summer Olympics in Rio de Janeiro in the women's 63 kg division. She was defeated by Mariana Silva of Brazil in the second round. In 2020, she won one of the bronze medals in the women's 63 kg event at the 2020 European Judo Championships held in Prague, Czech Republic.

She also competed in the women's 63 kg event at the 2020 Summer Olympics held in Tokyo, Japan.

References

External links
 

1989 births
Living people
German female judoka
German people of Polish descent
European Games gold medalists for Germany
European Games silver medalists for Germany
European Games medalists in judo
Judoka at the 2015 European Games
Judoka at the 2016 Summer Olympics
Olympic judoka of Germany
Sportspeople from Bełchatów
Judoka at the 2019 European Games
Judoka at the 2020 Summer Olympics
Medalists at the 2020 Summer Olympics
Olympic medalists in judo
Olympic bronze medalists for Germany
20th-century German women
21st-century German women